Michael R. Gold (born August 30, 1956) is a Canadian immunologist and cell biologist. He has served as head of the Department of Microbiology and Immunology at the University of British Columbia since July 2009. He is known for his discovery of how B-cell receptor stimulates Tyrosine phosphorylation and work in the signaling cascade of B-cell receptor.

Biography
Gold was born and raised in New York City, New York, USA in 1956. He attended John Bowne High School in Flushing, New York. and then Michigan State University. He was a graduate student at University of California, Berkeley from 1978 to 1984, under the supervision of Robert I. Mishell. The goal of his Ph.D. project was to characterize biochemically a receptor present on macrophages that recognizes the polymer peptidoglycan. He then entered a postdoctoral fellowship  at the University of California, San Francisco from 1985 to 1991, working on B-cell signalling with Anthony DeFranco. He then worked as a research associate in Ruedi Aebersold’s lab at the Institute for Systems Biology in Seattle, Washington,  from 1991 to 1993.

Gold's work led to many important findings, emphasizing the importance of how antigen receptors on the surface of B-cells might trigger the adaptive immunity upon recognizing their cognate antigens.

Over a decade, Gold's laboratory has been intensely focusing on how the roles of Rap GTPases in mediating cell mobility, cell migration, tumor motility and metastasis. He is interested in how changes in cytoskeletal structure and function by Rap may affect B-cell receptor activation and signalling cascade. Gold's publications have been cited more than 6,200 times, with an h-index of 42.

Gold is a faculty member of the Department of Microbiology and Immunology at the University of British Columbia, where he teaches immunogenetics. He has been Head of the Department of Microbiology and Immunology since July 2009.

He was the President of the Heart Rhythm Society from 2016 to 2017.

Fellowships and awards
2013, Canadian Society for Immunology Cinader Award

Editorships
Associate editor, Frontiers in B Cell Biology, 2010–present
Member, Faculty of 1000

References

Works

External links
 The Gold Lab
 Infection, Inflammation and Immunity
 Michael Gold at Google Scholar

1956 births
Living people
Canadian biologists
Canadian immunologists
Academic staff of the University of British Columbia